Eutropis cumingi, also known commonly as Cuming's eared skink, Cuming's mabouya, and Cuming's mabuya, is a species of lizard in the family Scincidae. The species is endemic to the Philippines.

Etymology
The specific name, cumingi, is in honor of English naturalist, Hugh Cuming, who collected the holotype.

Geographic range
E. cumingi is found in the northern parts of the Philippines (Luzon, Calayan, Camiguin, and Lubang) as well as in Orchid Island southeast of Taiwan.

Habitat

Diet
E. cumingi preys upon cockroaches and other insects.

Reproduction
E. cumingi is oviparous. Clutch size is two eggs.

References

Further reading
Brown WC, Alcala AC (1980). Philippine Lizards of the Family Scincidae. (Silliman University Natural History Monograph Series). City of Dumaguete, Negros Oriental, Philippines: Silliman University. i–xi + 246 pp. (Mabuya cumingi, new species, p. 117).
Greer AE, Telford SR Jr (2004). "Some observations on the morphology and reproduction of the Philippine Islands skink Mabuya cumingi ". Hamadryad 29: 1–4.
Ota H, Huang W-S (2000). "Mabuya cumingi (Reptilia: Scincidae): an addition to the herpetofauna of Lanyu Island, Taiwan". Current Herpetology 19 (2): 57–61.

Eutropis
Reptiles of the Philippines
Reptiles of Taiwan
Reptiles described in 1980
Taxa named by Angel Chua Alcala
Taxa named by Walter Creighton Brown